USC&GS Hydrographer was the name of two United States Coast and Geodetic Survey ships, and may refer to:

, a survey ship in service from 1901 to 1917 and from 1919 to 1928
USC&GS Hydrographer (1928), a survey ship in service from 1931 to 1942 and from 1946 to 1967 with World War II U.S. Navy service as 

Ships of the United States Coast and Geodetic Survey